You Must Change Your Life is a book written by the German philosopher Peter Sloterdijk about the history and philosophy of practice across the planet as well as the development of anthropotechnics. Originally published in German in 2009, it was translated into English in 2013.

Sloterdijk uses "Anthropotechnics" to refer to "techniques of individual and collective self-transformation" with a lens that sees "human life not in terms of a struggle between those who wield power and those who are subject to it (he dismisses this version of history as leftist kitsch), but in terms of the networks of 'discipline' through which we live our lives and construct our world".

Keith Ansell-Pearson received this work as "a tour de force that engages the history of philosophy, religion, and thought, both Western and Eastern, in ways that make you think deeply about the evolution of the human being these past few thousand years. As if this weren’t already enough, Sloterdijk is also concerned with the future, and on a planetary scale. Where are we heading? Where do we wish to go? More to the point, where must we go? How must we change our lives?"

References

2009 non-fiction books
Books by Peter Sloterdijk
German non-fiction books
Philosophy books